Area code 949 is a telephone area code in the North American Numbering Plan (NANP) for the U.S. state of California in southern Orange County.

On April 18, 1998, the southern cities of Orange County were split from the numbering plan area 714, and assigned the new area code 949. The area includes cities such as Newport Beach, Irvine, Lake Forest, Portola Hills, Coto de Caza, Dove Canyon, Aliso Viejo, Trabuco Canyon, Capistrano Beach, Corona del Mar, Laguna Niguel, Laguna Hills, Laguna Woods, Newport Coast, Foothill Ranch, Robinson Ranch, Mission Viejo, San Juan Capistrano, Rancho Santa Margarita, Ladera Ranch, Dana Point, Laguna Beach, and San Clemente. The city of Costa Mesa is divided between the 949 and 714 area codes, being split at Wilson Street and along Newport Boulevard. A very small portion of Irvine is also uses the 714 area code, from the north side of Culver Drive at the I-5 to Jamboree Road in the Marketplace, in the neighborhood of Northpark Irvine.

Service area

Aliso Viejo
Costa Mesa (primarily the Eastside)
Coto de Caza
Dana Point
Irvine (small portion in the 657/714 area code)
Ladera Ranch
Laguna Beach
Laguna Hills
Laguna Niguel
Laguna Woods
Lake Forest
Las Flores
Mission Viejo
Newport Beach
Newport Coast
Rancho Santa Margarita
San Clemente
San Juan Capistrano
Santa Ana (mostly in the 657/714 area code)
Santa Ana Heights
Trabuco Canyon
Tustin (mostly in the 657/714 area code)

See also
List of California area codes
List of NANP area codes

References

External links

 949 Area Code in California

949
Orange County, California
San Diego County, California
949